The Icelandic Women's Super Cup (Icelandic: Meistarakeppni kvenna) is an annual football  game between the reigning champions of the Icelandic League (Úrvalsdeild) champions and the Icelandic Cup holders (or, if the same team holds both titles, between the title-holder and (usually) the team in second place in the Úrvalsdeild or occasionally the second placed team in the Icelandic Cup). It generally takes place at the start of the Iceland domestic season, in May and has been running uninterrupted since 2003 (when the holders of the 2002 titles met). Before that the competition was  uninterrupted between 1992 and 1998. Title-holders from 1999, 2000 and 2001 did not play for this title.

The most successful team is Breiðablik with a total of nine wins.

Past Finals 

There were two games played in 1996, one in the spring and one in the autumn, with the spring-game covering the year before and the autumn-game covering the just-finished season. For easier understanding the years listed are always the year after a team won the Úrvalsdeild or Cup (so the autumn games are listed as having been played the year after they were played).

1 - After Extra Time

2 - Penalties

3 - The league champions also won the cup.

Results by teams

See also 

 Icelandic Women's Cup
 Deildabikar Women

References

External links 
 Soccerway

Football cup competitions in Iceland
National association football supercups